The chairman of the Presidency of Bosnia and Herzegovina is the presiding member of the Presidency of Bosnia and Herzegovina, which collectively serves as head of state of Bosnia and Herzegovina.

Željka Cvijanović has been the incumbent officeholder, since 16 November 2022. She is the first female occupant of the office.

Constitution of Bosnia and Herzegovina

According to the Article V of the Constitution of Bosnia and Herzegovina, the Presidency comprises three members, representing the constituent nations of Bosnia and Herzegovina: one Bosniak, one Serb, and one Croat. The Bosniak and Croat members are elected from a joint constituency in the Federation of Bosnia and Herzegovina, whilst the Serb member is elected from voters in Republika Srpska.

The three members elected at any one election serve a collective four-year term. Individuals are able to serve no more than two consecutive four-year terms, although there are no overall term limits.

Although the unsubdivided body is the collective head of state, one member is designated as Chairperson. The position of Chairperson rotates twice around the three members every eight months, with the candidate receiving the most votes overall becoming the first Chairperson over the four-year term.

List of chairpersons

Before independence (1945–1992)

Since independence (1992–present)

See also
Presidency of Bosnia and Herzegovina
List of members of the Presidency of Bosnia and Herzegovina
List of members of the Presidency of Bosnia and Herzegovina by time in office
Chairman of the Council of Ministers of Bosnia and Herzegovina

References

External links
predsjednistvobih.ba in 

Heads of state of Bosnia and Herzegovina
 
Bosnia and Herzegovina politics-related lists
Bosnia and Herzegovina
1996 establishments in Bosnia and Herzegovina